Michael Davis (born 21 January 2002) is a Belgian professional footballer who plays as a centre-back for Young Reds on loan from Beveren.

Club career
On 16 August 2022, Davis was loaned by Beveren to Antwerp for the 2022–23 season, with an option to buy. At Antwerp, he was assigned to the reserves squad Young Reds, which plays in the third-tier Belgian National Division 1.

References 

2002 births
Black Belgian sportspeople
Living people
Belgian footballers
Belgium youth international footballers
Association football central defenders
RWDM47 players
K.V. Mechelen players
S.K. Beveren players
Royal Antwerp F.C. players
Challenger Pro League players
Belgian National Division 1 players